Rahman Myratberdiýew (born 31 October 2001) is a Turkmenistani footballer who plays as a striker for Altyn Asyr FK of the Ýokary Liga, and the Turkmenistan national team.

Club career
Myratberdiýew competed in the 2021 AFC Cup with Altyn Asyr FK, making appearances against FC Alay of Kyrgyzstan and FC Nasaf of Uzbekistan.

International career
Myratberdiýew represented Turkmenistan in 2020 AFC U-19 Championship qualification. He scored two goals in the campaign, one against Qatar and another against Sri Lanka. The same year he competed in the 2019 CAFA Under-19 Championship, scoring one goal in three matches. His goal came in a 1–5 defeat to Tajikistan.

Myratberdiýew made his senior international debut on 5 June 2021 in a 2022 FIFA World Cup qualification match against South Korea.

Career statistics

Club
As of 6 July 2021

International

References

External links

AFC profile

2001 births
Living people
Turkmenistan footballers
Turkmenistan international footballers
People from Ahal Region
FC Altyn Asyr players
Association football forwards